Dolno Perovo, or simply Perovo, is a village north of Lake Prespa in the Resen Municipality of North Macedonia. The village is located almost  from the municipal centre of Resen.

Demographics
Perovo's population has generally declined over the past several decades.

References

Villages in Resen Municipality